

The siege of Moscow in 1382 was a battle between the Grand Duchy of Moscow (Muscovy) and Tokhtamysh, khan of the Golden Horde.

Background 
The siege of Moscow in 1382 was motivated by khan Tokhtamysh's desire to punish Muscovy for its audacity to challenge the authority of the Golden Horde at the Battle of Kulikovo (1380). Even though it was his rival warlord Mamai who was defeated at Kulikovo, and Tokhtamysh personally defeated Mamai the next year at the Battle of the Kalka River (1381) to become the undisputed khan of the Golden Horde, he wanted to make Moscow an example of what happened if anyone dared defy Mongol supremacy over the Rus' principalities. Tokhtamysh allied himself (in part through coercion) with the Rus' princes of Tver, Riazan, and Nizhniy Novgorod against Muscovy, and launched a surprise attack on the city in 1382. Prince Dmitry Donskoy, who had lead his largely Muscovite army to a pyrrhic victory at Kulikovo two years earlier, abandoned his capital and fled north, leaving the dismayed citizens of Moscow to ask a Lithuanian prince named Ostei (or Ostej), a grandson of Algirdas, to lead the defence.

The Tale of the Invasion of Tokhtamysh contains an account of the 1382 siege of Moscow. As the khan's forces drew nearer, it narrates:

Siege 
The Muscovite defenders are recorded to have used traditional weapons such as arrows and boiling water, with some sources claiming that they also employed early firearms with gunpowder.

The princes of Nizhniy Novgorod, who were the brothers-in-law of Dmitry Donskoy, tricked the Muscovite citizens into surrendering the city. This happened when they opened the gates to the Mongols and their Rus' allies on 26 August 1382, whereupon they immediately sacked the city. According to Crummey (1987, 2014), the besiegers lured Ostei out of the fortress under the pretense of seeking negotiations, killed him, and then broke into the Muscovite citadel, put many of its defenders to the sword, and destroyed large parts of Moscow city. Tokhtamysh ordered his troops to also pillage many smaller towns in the surrounding region afterwards. These included Serpukhov, Pereyaslavl, and Kolomna. As his army went home to the south, it also sacked the principality of Riazan along the way.

Aftermath 
Dmitri Donskoy was forced to reaffirm his allegiance to the Golden Horde, and resumed paying the tribute (which was probably increased as punishment). Although Tokhtamysh did not deprive Donskoy of the title of grand prince of Vladimir, he did take his son Vasily hostage for several years (until he escaped upon his second attempt, and imposed a heavy tribute on all of Vladimir-Suzdalia.

Kirpichnikov stated: "There is no dispute that Tokhtamysh's invasion of Moscow slowed the unification of the country and revived the separatism of some local rulers who rival the grand duke."

Notes

References

Further reading 
  (originally published in 1987).
  (e-book).

External links
 
 

Conflicts in 1382
Moscow 1382
1382 in Europe
Moscow (1382)
Moscow
14th century in the Grand Duchy of Moscow
Military history of Moscow